The Diocese of Ciudad Lázaro Cárdenas is a Latin Church ecclesiastical territory or diocese of the Catholic Church. It is a suffragan in the ecclesiastical province to the metropolitan Archdiocese of Morelia. Its cathedra is within the Cathedral of Christ the King, in the episcopal see of Lázaro Cárdenas, Michoacán.

History
The Diocese of Ciudad Lázaro Cárdenas was erected on 11 October 1985. It was a suffragan of the Archdiocese of Acapulco until 25 November 2006.

Ordinaries
José de Jesús Sahagún de la Parra (1985 – 1993) 
Salvador Flores Huerta (1993 – 2006)
Fabio Martínez Castilla (2007 - 2013), appointed Archbishop of Tuxtla Gutierrez
Armando António Ortíz Aguirre (2013 - present)

External links and references

Ciudad Lazaro Cardenas
Ciudad Lázaro Cárdenas, Roman Catholic Diocese of
Ciudad Lazaro Cardenas
Ciudad Lazaro Cardenas
1985 establishments in Mexico